The Albatros C.XIV was a German two seat, single engine, biplane fighter aircraft built in 1918. Only one was constructed.

Design and development

After experimenting in 1917 with Idflieg two seat CL-class aircraft based on their single seat D.V, Albatros returned to the two bay biplane layout and flat sided fuselage of their earlier C types with the C.XIV.

The wings of the C.XIV were straight edged and of constant chord, with the two bays formed by parallel pairs of interplane struts.  The C.XIV was the first Albatros C type to include stagger. The upper wing, held well above the fuselage on a cabane, had a semicircular cut-out to improve the pilot's vision from the forward of two tandem, open cockpits.  Ailerons, which increased in chord outwards behind the inner line of the trailing edge, were fitted to this wing.

The C.XIV was powered by a  Mercedes D.III, mounted with the upper parts of its six inline cylinders partly exposed.  It had a tall exhaust which reached over the wing leading edge-mounted radiator. The tailplane was mounted at the bottom of the fuselage. The undercarriage was of the fixed type, with mainwheels on V-struts and a faired-in tailskid.

It first flew in the spring of 1918 but did not go into production.  Instead, it was modified into the larger but lighter C.XV which entered a production run ended by the Armistice with Germany.

Specifications

References

Biplanes
C.XIV
1910s German fighter aircraft
Aircraft first flown in 1918